Robert Walkinshaw Harley (born 8 September 1888 in Renfrew, Scotland - died in Winnipeg, Manitoba, Canada in 1958) was a Canadian soccer player in the 1920s.

Harley earned his 7 Canadian national soccer team caps in captaining the side to a 2 wins, 3 losses, and 2 draws record in their 1924 tour of Australia and New Zealand in games against those countries' national sides.

Raised in Scotland, and in Rangers F.C.'s youth program for a time, Harley immigrated to Canada in 1911, settling to Winnipeg. He captained amateur club soccer for United Weston, although he was not with the club when they won the Canadian Club Championships in 1924 and '26.

Harley was inducted into the Canadian Soccer Hall of Fame in 2003 and the Manitoba Sports Hall of Fame in 2004.

References

External links
 / Canada Soccer Hall of Fame

1888 births
1958 deaths
Canada men's international soccer players
Canada Soccer Hall of Fame inductees
Canadian soccer players
Association football defenders
Naturalized citizens of Canada
People from Renfrew
Footballers from Renfrewshire
Soccer players from Winnipeg
Manitoba Sports Hall of Fame inductees
British emigrants to Canada